National is an unincorporated community in Monongalia County, West Virginia, United States.

The community took its name from a local mining company.

References 

Unincorporated communities in West Virginia
Unincorporated communities in Monongalia County, West Virginia
Coal towns in West Virginia